Gangambike Mallikarjun was the 52nd Mayor of Bangalore (Bruhat Bangalore Mahanagara Palike). She was the eighth female mayor of the city and she was elected in September 2018. In this election, she contested from the Jayanagar ward.

Personal life 
Gangambike Mallikarjun was born on 11 November 1978 She pursued a bachelor's degree in commerce (B. Com). She is married to B Mallikarjun, who is an engineer by profession. The couple have two children, one son (Prajwal) and a daughter (Nandini).

References 

Living people
Indian National Congress politicians from Karnataka
Mayors of Bangalore
Politicians from Bangalore
1978 births